Vexillum concentricum is a species of small sea snail, marine gastropod mollusk in the family Costellariidae, the ribbed miters.

Description
It has a shell size of 15 to 32.6 mm

(Original description) The shell is acuminately ovate, somewhat fusiform. It is longitudinally concentrically ribbed, the ribs pointed at the upper part, interstices impressly striated. The shell is whitish, stained here and therewith spots of rusty brown, with a broad band round the base. The columella is five-plaited . The interior of the aperture is striated.

Distribution
This marine species occurs in the Indo-West Pacific; also in the Red Sea and off Australia (Queensland)

References

 Melvill, J.C. (1904). Note on Mitra stephanucha Melv., with description of a new variety. Journal of Malacology. 11: 86, pl. 8.
 Cotton, B.C. 1957. Family Mitridae. Royal Society of South Australia Malacological Section 12: 8 pp. 
 Salisbury, R.A. 1999. Costellariidae of the World, Pt. 1. Of Sea and Shore 22(3): 124-136
 Turner H. (2001) Katalog der Familie Costellariidae Macdonald 1860 (Gastropoda: Prosobranchia: Muricoidea). Hackenheim: Conchbooks. 100 pp.

=External links
  Liénard, Élizé. Catalogue de la faune malacologique de l'île Maurice et de ses dépendances comprenant les îles Seychelles, le groupe de Chagos composé de Diego-Garcia, Six-îles, Pèros-Banhos, Salomon, etc., l'île Rodrigues, l'île de Cargados ou Saint-Brandon. J. Tremblay, 1877.
 Turner, H. (1995). Vexillum (Costellaria) concentricum (Reeve, 1844) dug out from the graveyard of synonymy. Hawaiian Shell News. 43 (12): 1, 12

concentricum
Gastropods described in 1844